Leroy Looper (November 24, 1924 – September 11, 2011) was a community organizer and founder of several low-income housing facilities, programs for addiction recovery, and education initiatives in San Francisco. He was known by locals as "the father of the Tenderloin".

References

External links
 Leroy Looper Memorial Page.
 Board-and-Care, "The New Yorker", October 12, 1987.

People from San Francisco
African-American businesspeople
American businesspeople
African-American founders
American founders
Housing rights activists
Homelessness activists
Housing reformers
Community organizing
Antioch University alumni
Mental health activists
1924 births
2011 deaths
Activists from California
20th-century African-American people
21st-century African-American people